German submarine U-635 was a Type VIIC U-boat built for Nazi Germany's Kriegsmarine for service during World War II.
She was laid down on 3 October 1941 by Blohm & Voss, Hamburg as yard number 611, launched on 24 June 1942 and commissioned on 13 August 1942 under Oberleutnant zur See Heinz Eckelmann.

Design
German Type VIIC submarines were preceded by the shorter Type VIIB submarines. U-635 had a displacement of  when at the surface and  while submerged. She had two shafts and two  propellers.

U-635 was fitted with five  torpedo tubes (four fitted at the bow and one at the stern), fourteen torpedoes, one  SK C/35 naval gun, 220 rounds, and one twin  C/30 anti-aircraft gun. The boat had a complement of between forty-four and sixty.

Service history
The boat's career began with training at 5th U-boat Flotilla on 13 August 1942, followed by active service on 1 April 1943 as part of the 3rd Flotilla for the remainder of her very short service.

Convoy HX 231
In April 1943, U-635 joined the wolfpack Löwenherz and attacked the Eastbound convoy HX 231 bound for Liverpool from Halifax, Nova Scotia.

At 22:15 on 4 April, U-635’s torpedoes struck the lead ship of the column, the British freighter Shillong.  delivered the coup de grâce. She took only 12 minutes to sink.

The next target was the British refrigerated ship Waroonga, whose cargo included butter and meat from New Zealand. She was hit with 2 torpedoes, but stayed afloat thanks to the integrity of her watertight bulkheads. However, it wasn't to last as she too was despatched by  the following day.

Fate
U-635 was sunk on 5 April 1943 in the North Atlantic in position , by depth charges from RAF Liberator of 120 Squadron. All hands were lost.

Wolfpacks
U-635 took part in one wolfpack, namely:
 Löwenherz (1 – 5 April 1943)

Summary of raiding history

References

Bibliography

External links

German Type VIIC submarines
1942 ships
U-boats commissioned in 1942
Ships lost with all hands
U-boats sunk in 1943
U-boats sunk by depth charges
U-boats sunk by British aircraft
World War II shipwrecks in the Atlantic Ocean
World War II submarines of Germany
Ships built in Hamburg
Maritime incidents in April 1943